"Alla barnen" (Swedish for All the children) is a type of humorous poetic form, told primarily by schoolchildren in Swedish, although it originated in Denmark. This meme was most popular in the early 1990s, as they were very macabre which at the time was highly unusual but their popularity has since diminished. The comic book writing duo Måns Gahrton and Johan Unenge has created several books based on the form, all with a title starting with "Alla barnen", the later ones in the series have discarded the more macabre jokes to be more child-friendly.

Form 
Compared to a limerick Alla Barnen is more free form with no set meter. They consist of three parts and these are:

All the children were or did something (Alla barnen var eller gjorde någonting)
Except for Example Name (Utom Exempelnamn)
He/she could not because of something (Han/hon kunde inte på grund av någonting)

And the name must rhyme with the end of the sentence.

Examples

References 

Swedish humour